{{DISPLAYTITLE:List of Ben 10 characters}}
This is a list of characters in the universe of Cartoon Network's Ben 10 franchise.

List indicator(s)
 This table shows the recurring characters and the actors who have portrayed them throughout the franchise.
 A dark grey cell indicates the character was not in the series or film, or that the character's presence in the series or film has not yet been announced.
 A  indicates an appearance as a younger version of a pre-existing character.
 A  indicates a cameo appearance.
 A  indicates an appearance in onscreen photographs only.
 A  indicates an appearance in deleted scenes only.
 A  indicates a motion-capture role.
 A  indicates an uncredited role.

Main characters
Ben Tennyson

Voiced by:

 Tara Strong - Ben 10, Ben 10: Secret of the Omnitrix, Ben 10: Ultimate Alien (as 10 years old in "Forge Of Creation"), Ben 10: Omniverse (11 years old), and Ben 10 (2016) and various commercials, shorts and video games
 Yuri Lowenthal - Ben 10: Alien Force, Ben 10: Ultimate Alien , Ben 10: Omniverse and Ben 10 (2016) (as an elderly Ben in "The 11th Alien: Part 1" and as the teenage Bens in "Alien X-tiction"), various commercials and video games
Scott Menville - Ben 10 Acceso Total (as 10 years old in Commercial 1 only)

Portrayed by:
 Graham Phillips - Ben 10: Race Against Time Ryan Kelley - Ben 10: Alien SwarmBenjamin "Ben" Kirby Tennyson (alias "Ben 10") is the main protagonist of the franchise, wielder of the Omnitrix, a powerful watch-like device that allowed him to turn into multiple different aliens. He is the cousin of Gwen Tennyson and best friend to Kevin Levin.

Gwen Tennyson

Voiced by:
 Meagan Smith - Ben 10 
 Ashley Johnson - Ben 10: Alien Force, Ben 10: Ultimate Alien, and Ben 10: Omniverse 
 Montserrat Hernandez - Ben 10 (2016)Portrayed by:
 Haley Ramm - Ben 10: Race Against Time Galadriel Stineman - Ben 10: Alien SwarmGwendolyn "Gwen" Tennyson is Ben's paternal cousin and Kevin's love interest, a skilled sorceress who inherited her magical "spark" from her Anodite grandmother.

Max Tennyson
Voiced by:
 Paul Eiding - Ben 10, Ben 10: Alien Force, Ben 10: Ultimate Alien, and Ben 10: Omniverse 
 Adam Wylie - Ben 10 (as a kid in "Don't Drink the Water")
 Jason Marsden - Ben 10: Ultimate Alien (as a young adult in "Moonstruck")
 David Kaye - Ben 10 (2016)Portrayed by:
 Lee Majors - Ben 10: Race Against Time Barry Corbin - Ben 10: Alien SwarmMaxwell "Max" Tennyson is a retired Plumber and the paternal grandfather of Ben and Gwen.

Kevin Levin
Voiced by:
 Michael Reisz - Ben 10 (in the episode "Kevin 11")
 Charlie Schlatter - Ben 10 (in later episodes)
 Greg Cipes - Ben 10: Alien Force, Ben 10: Ultimate Alien, Ben 10: Omniverse, and Ben 10 (2016)Portrayed by:
 Nathan Keyes - Ben 10: Alien SwarmKevin Ethan Levin is an Osmosian, a mutant subspecies of human, who first appeared as one of Ben's enemies but reformed as his best friend and Gwen's love interest.

Rook Blonko
Voiced by:
Bumper Robinson - Ben 10 OmniverseRook Blonko is an alien from the fictional planet Revonnah. He serves as Ben's new partner throughout the series ever since after Gwen and Kevin left the team in Ommiverse.''

References

External links
 Ben 10 Characters official US site

2000s television-related lists
2010s television-related lists
2020s television-related lists
Lists of characters in American television animation
Ben 10
Cartoon Network Studios characters
Cartoon Network Studios superheroes